The Tuvan National Orchestra reflects the complex history of the Republic of Tuva (sometimes spelled Tyva), a federal subject of Russia which sits at the southern edge of Siberia, with Mongolia to its south. Over the centuries, Tuva has been part of Chinese and Mongolian empires, and shares many cultural ties with Mongolia. In 1944 it joined the Soviet Union, and Tuva is now a constituent republic of the Russian Federation.

Formed in 2003 as the Tuvan National Orchestra of Traditional Instruments, the orchestra was originally directed by Aldar Tamdyn. It is now led by Conductor and Artistic Director Ayana Samiyaevna Mongush. In this unique orchestra, traditional Tuvan instruments are played alongside classical Western instruments and Soviet-era “hybrid” instruments. In addition, the musicians sing as well as play. The orchestra's repertoire often features the ancient art of Tuvan throat singing (xöömei), a remarkable technique for singing multiple pitches at the same time. Ayana Mongush is perhaps the only person in the world who can arrange and score music for such an unusual combination of instruments and voices. The orchestra is extremely versatile, at times sounding more western, at times more Tuvan. Its unique renditions of traditional Tuvan songs are especially popular in Tuva.

The Tuvan National Orchestra has earned recognition throughout the Russian Federation. In 2005, just two years after its inception, it won one of the first prizes in the All-Russia Competition of Folk Orchestras and Ensembles, held in Saratov, Russia. The following year it competed in the newly configured All-Russia Competition of National Orchestras and Ensembles, held in Ulan-Ude (capital of the Republic of Buryatia, Russia), where it won the overall grand prize as well as a special prize for the most original program. It then performed in a two-day gala held in Moscow in 2008 to honor the regional winners.

Orchestra members include musicians known in the West for their throatsinging (members of the groups Chirgilchin, Tyva Kyzy, and Alash), Andrei Mongush (formerly of Huun-Huur-Tu), Ai-Xaan Oorzhak, Kang-Xuler Saaya, and Nikolai Damba, among others.

External links 
Tuvan National Orchestra Official Website
Tuvan Orchestra is a Prize-Winner at the All-Russian Folk Contest 
Tuvan Orchestra of Traditional Instruments Takes Part in All-Russian Contest
Tuvan Orchestra of Traditional Instruments will Take Part in the Final of the All-Russian Musical Contest

Musical groups from Tuva